Walter Wanger's Vogues of 1938 (also known by its shortened form, Vogues of 1938) is a 1937 musical comedy film produced by Walter Wanger and distributed by United Artists. It was directed by Irving Cummings, written by Bella Spewack and Sam Spewack, and starred Warner Baxter and Joan Bennett. It was filmed in New York City in Technicolor.

It was nominated for two Academy Awards for Best Art Direction (Alexander Toluboff), and Best Original Song (Sammy Fain (music) and Lew Brown (lyrics)) for the song That Old Feeling sung by Virginia Verrill.

Plot
A successful fashion designer life, beset at home by his shrewish wife and at work by his competitors, has become even more complicated when one of his customers, a bride-to-be, jilts her wealthy husband and comes to him looking for a job—and possibly romance.

Cast
 Warner Baxter as George Curson 
 Joan Bennett as Wendy Van Klettering 
 Helen Vinson as Mary Curson 
 Mischa Auer as Prince Muratov 
 Alan Mowbray as Henry Morgan 
 Jerome Cowan as Mr. W. Brockton
 Alma Kruger as Sophie Miller
 Gonzalo Meroño as Richard Steward
Also, a young Penny Singleton, then known as Dorothy McNulty. Singleton went on to star in the series of "Blondie" movies and the voice of Jane in the "Jetsons" cartoons.

Reception
The film reported a loss of $256,207.

References

External links 
 
 
 

1937 films
1937 musical comedy films
1937 romantic comedy films
American musical comedy films
American romantic comedy films
American romantic musical films
Films directed by Irving Cummings
Films shot in New York City
Films produced by Walter Wanger
1930s romantic musical films
1930s American films